The 2009 Arizona Wildcats baseball team represented the University of Arizona in the 2009 NCAA Division I baseball season. The Wildcats played their home games  at Jerry Kindall Field at Frank Sancet Stadium. The team was coached by Andy Lopez in his 8th season at Arizona.

Personnel

Roster

Coaches

Opening day

Schedule and results

2009 MLB draft

References 

Arizona
Arizona Wildcats baseball seasons
Arizona baseball